A referendum on independence was held in Rhodesia on 5 November 1964. The question put to voters was, "Are you in favour of or against Rhodesia obtaining independence on the basis of the 1961 Constitution of Rhodesia?" The result was a landslide for the "yes" vote, which was the choice of over 90% of voters, although less than 15% of the voter roll was black. Prime Minister Ian Smith called an indaba with tribal leaders to gauge support, resulting in universal support among the tribal leaders, but Britain did not consider this representative of the majority black population as the tribal leaders were in the pay of the government. The following year, Smith's government made a Unilateral Declaration of Independence, making the country a de facto independent state until returning to British colonial rule in 1979 following the Lancaster House Agreement. The British Government did not accept Rhodesian independence as they did not view the referendum as representative of all of Rhodesia.

Voter turnout was 62%.

Results

References

Southern Rhodesia
Referendums in Zimbabwe
Independence referendum
Constitutional referendums in Zimbabwe
Rhodesia